Luke Edward Hall (born 1989) is a British interior designer, described by both The Times and The Guardian as a "rising design star".

He was educated at Central Saint Martins, and worked for Ben Pentreath before establishing his own studio in 2015. He has designed collections for Burberry and Liberty.

References

External links

Official website

British interior designers
1989 births
Living people
Alumni of Central Saint Martins